Lee Sumyeong (Hangul: 이수명, born 1965) is a South Korean poet, critic, and translator. Her poetic style has reputation of being unfamiliar and difficult, but some also comment that she is a classicist as well as a modernist. One critic has said that she has already "laid out a completed road", upon the genealogy of modernism and that "many younger poets are working on that road", emphasizing the fact that her poetry was pioneering in how she overturned common usage of words and stereotypes.

Life 
Born and raised in Seoul, Lee Sumyeong studied Korean language and literature at Seoul National University. Her debut publication of 5 poems in the literary journal Jakkasegye (Writer's World) won the journal's 1994 New Writer Award. In 2007, she received her doctorate from Chung-Ang University with a study of Kim Ku-yong, a major literary influence. Her monograph is one of the pioneering works about the hitherto rarely discussed poet.

She is known as one of the poets that represents Korea's modernism since the 1990s. She has published many essays on poetry, critical essay collections, and research papers on modernism. She has won the 2nd Park In-Hwan Literary Award in 2001, the 12th Hyeondaesi (Contemporary Poetics) Award in 2011, the 12th Nojak Literary Prize in 2012, and the 7th Yi Sang Poetry Award in 2014. She participate in the 2016 Seoul International Writer's Festival (SIWF).

Writing 
Lee Sumyeong has been strongly influenced by Korean avant-garde poets, including Yi Sang, Kim Ku-yong, and Kim Jongsam, as well as by Western poets like Wallace Stevens, Paul Celan, and René Char. Renowned for the "impenetrability" and the deceptive "tidy-style," Lee Sumyeong's works, some critics claim, may be interpreted as the search for a radical way to "let things, not humans, speak".

Lee Sumyeong's first poetry collection was Saeroun odoki georireul mewotda (새로운 오독이 거리를 메웠다 New Misreading Filled the Streets). The title signifies poet Lee Sumyeong's critical mind. Misreading is the act of distorting the linguistic content, but from the poet's perspective, language inevitably becomes in discordance with reality. Lee Sumyeong accepts this fact, and instead of attempting to do the impossible dream of copying reality accurately, she attempts to overturn everyday phrases. On that aspect, Lee Sumyeong was a poet who "started from the position of reflecting on the violence of lyric poetry and poetic subjects that have become a constituent custom" (Park Sang-su).

However, that does not mean that Lee Sumyeong's poetry is just speculative and ideological. In contrast, what she focuses are efforts on capturing minute feelings during a specific moment. Instead of conventionally describing that, she tries to restructure it with her own lucid and fantastical language. Lee Sumyeong's poetry can seem ambiguous, but by revealing a new aspect of an object that doesn't converge on an already established conceptual meaning, her poetry is evident of her critical mind that wants to offer readers fresh, raw feelings and imagination.

Her poetry often features unusual expressions. For instance, she writes sentences where time and space are distorted such as ‘children streaming through the air the stairs are playing’ or ‘One day I was conforming to my stone throwing. I was amongst the stones that I was throwing.’ Through such expressions, Lee Sumyeong makes a very particular poetic universe. Thus, Lee Sumyeong's poetry is not read much by the public. However, her works have earned the acclaim of the literary critics from the 1990s, and even now she is having great influence on younger poets.

Early on, her poetry had many works that used ‘ice’ as a symbolic image for everyday life. Meanwhile, from the 2010s she has used the image of ‘water’ more often, switching the positions of the poetic subject and the narrator. Such experimentation was a result of attempting to find a world potentially there that does not actually exist.

Works

Collections of poems 
Saeroun odoki georireul mewotda (새로운 오독이 거리를 메웠다 New Misreading Filled the Streets), Segyesa, 1995.

Waegarineun waegari nolireul handa (왜가리는 왜가리 놀이를 한다, Herons Play Heron's Play), Segyesa, 1998.

Bulgeun damjangui keobeu (붉은 담장의 커브 The Curve of the Red Wall), Minumsa, 2001

Goyangi bidioreul boneun goyangi (고양이 비디오를 보는 고양이 The Cat Watching the Cat Video), Moonji Publishing, 2004.

Eonjaena neomu maneun bideul (언제나 너무 많은 비들 Always Too Much Rain), Moonji Publishing, 2011.

Machi (마치 Just Like), Moonji Publishing, 2014

Mullyuchanggo (물류창고 Warehouse), Moonji Publishing, 2018

Prose works 
Kim Gu-yonggwa Hanguk Hyeondaesi (김구용과 한국 현대시 Kim Gu-yong and Modern Korean Poetry), Korean Studies Information, 2008.
– monograph

Hoengdan (횡단 The Crossing), Munye Joongang, 2011. – essays on poetics

Gongseubui sidae (공습의 시대 The Age of Air Raids), Munhakdongne, 2016. – an idiosyncratic history of Korean poetry in 1990s

Pyomyeonui sihak (표면의 시학 The Poetics of Surfaces), Nanda, 2018. – new essays on poetics

Translations 
Duncan Heath, Introducing Romanticism, Gimm-Young Publishers, 2002.

Darian Leader, Introducing Lacan, Gimm-Young Publishers, 2002.

Jeff Collins, Introducing Derrida, Gimm-Young Publishers, 2003.

David Norris, Introducing Joyce, Gimm-Young Publishers, 2006.

Awards 
1994 Jakkasegye (Writer's World) New Writer Award.

2001 Park In-Hwan Literary Award.

2011 Hyeondaesi (Contemporary Poetics) Award.

2012 Nojak Literary Prize.

2014 Yi Sang Poetry Award.

2018 Kim Chunsu Poetry Award.

Further reading 
Son, Jineun, The Mind and Pattern of Korea's Modern Poetry, Saemi, 2001.

Kim, Sui, Hwangakui kalnal (환각의 칼날 The Blade of Hallucination), Cheongdonggeoul, 2002.

Jeong, Hyogu, The Joy of Reading Poetry 2, Jakkajungsin, 2003.

Jang, Seokju, "The Poetry of Plants 2", Seein Segye, Spring 2003.

External links 
 Naver Cast

Lee Sumyeong “Poetry is Difficult to Understand If You Analyze It. Just Enjoy It.” Cunningham “Even I Don’t Know Where My Poems End.”

References 

1965 births
Living people
20th-century South Korean poets
Seoul National University alumni
South Korean literary critics
21st-century South Korean poets
South Korean women poets
21st-century South Korean women writers
20th-century South Korean women writers